Blarnalearoch is a remote crofting township situated on the west shore of Loch Broom in Garve, Ross-shire, Scottish Highlands and is in the Scottish council area of Highland.

The hamlets of Loggie and Rhiroy lie directly southeast along the coast road.

References

Populated places in Ross and Cromarty